Patrick dos Santos Cruz (born 1 April 1993) is a Brazilian professional footballer who played as a forward.

Club career

Early career

Cruz began his career at São Paulo, and in 2014, he went to court against the club due to irregularities in his contract. Born in Minas Gerais, Cruz came through the youth academy at União Barbarense and impressed from an early age. Cruz was spotted by talent scouts who took him to the state capital where he subsequently joined São Paulo FC in 2011 at the age of 14.

Flamengo
He made his professional debut on 28 August 2013, in the second leg of the first stage of the Copa Sudamericana. He played the full 90 minutes of the goalless draw with Clube Atlético Paranaense at the Arena da Baixada. His domestic debut came on 13 March 2014, in the final eight minutes of a 5–0 home win over Mirassol Futebol Clube in the Campeonato Paulista. That year, he also made 11 substitute appearances for the team in the Campeonato Brasileiro Série A.

Corinthians

Initially, Cruz joined Corinthians after a contractual dispute with his former club Flamengo with Cruz's agent claiming that the club had not paid salaries as promised. That year, he also made 8 substitute appearances for the team in the Campeonato Brasileiro Série A.

T-Team
On 16 January 2016, Cruz signed a contract with Malaysia Super League club T-Team after association of Indonesia football been suspended that year.

Sài Gòn
On 10 January 2017, Vietnamese club Sài Gòn announced the signing of Cruz for the 2017 V.League 1 season. Cruz made his debut for Sài Gòn in a 2–1 win over SHB Đà Nẵng on 14 January 2017 and scored one goal in that match.

Pahang
On 23 February 2018, Cruz signed with Malaysia Super League side Pahang. One day later, he made his debut for Pahang and scored one goal in a 3–1 win over Selangor at KLFA Stadium.

Cruz start his campaign with flying colours by scoring a hat trick in the second leg FA cup match at Larkin Stadium which saw Pahang eliminated JDT 3-0 on aggregate.
28 April 2018, in league fixture he did scored a goal to helped Pahang win over Malacca 2-0.

Career statistics

Club

References

External links

1993 births
Living people
Brazilian footballers
Association football forwards
CR Flamengo footballers
Sport Club Corinthians Paulista players
Mitra Kukar players
Terengganu F.C. II players
Sri Pahang FC players
FC SKA-Khabarovsk players
Liga 1 (Indonesia) players
Malaysia Super League players
V.League 1 players
Brazilian expatriate footballers
Brazilian expatriate sportspeople in Indonesia
Brazilian expatriate sportspeople in Malaysia
Brazilian expatriate sportspeople in Vietnam
Brazilian expatriate sportspeople in Russia
Expatriate footballers in Indonesia
Expatriate footballers in Malaysia
Expatriate footballers in Vietnam
Expatriate footballers in Russia